Phyllodesmium tuberculatum is a species of sea slug, an aeolid nudibranch, a marine gastropod mollusc in the family Facelinidae.

Distribution 
This species was described from Twin Rocks, Mabini, Batangas Province, Luzon Island, Philippines.

References

Facelinidae
Gastropods described in 2009